A depressor weight is a device used on tow lines in nautical applications. A depressor weight can be attached to a floating or otherwise stiff line to effectively produce a catenary geometry better able to mitigate shocks associated with towing and wave impacts.

References

Nautical terminology